Farid Mansour  (1929–2010)    was a Lebanese sculptor and painter.

Biography 
Born In 1929 in Choueifat - Lebanon, Farid Mansour enrolled in the Lebanese Academy of Fine Arts (ALBA) in 1946, and was also mentored by the Italian artist Fernando Manetti between 1946 and 1949.

Seeking financial stability, Mansour migrated to Liberia for several years. He returned to his homeland in the mid 1950s to pursue his artistic career.

In 1961, Mansour invited and encouraged by Manetti himself, traveled to Italy specifically to Manetti's town of San Gimignano, where he continued his studies until 1963. In 1964 he joined the Ecole Universelle in Paris for one year, after which he returned to Lebanon again. In 1969, he traveled to London and enrolled in the City and Guilds of London Arts School, acquiring additional skills in sculpting and painting. During his stay in London and as a result of his outstanding skills he had private tuition and was assigned his own working space in the Pharaonic and in the Greco-Roman department of the British Museum between the years 1974 and 1976.Towards the end of 1976 he worked as a sculptor in Madame Tussauds where he participated in the making of several statues.

In 1977,  he was offered British citizenship, however he decided not to continue with the procedures out of fear that the erupted war in his homeland will lead to severe political and geographical disrupt, and that when he returns at a later date he would find his country not the country he once knew, the land not his land and the democracy no longer the same. He returned once again to his homeland to take part, in his own way, in the drastic sociopolitical changes taking place.

He never again left Beirut, enduring the various phases of the Lebanese war, including the bombing and shelling. 
His artworks during and after the Lebanese war were greatly influenced by the tragic events, humanitarian issues and dilemmas resulting from armed conflicts. Since then many of his artworks embodied the need for change towards a better future, freedom and equality.

Mansour taught arts and painting at the Lebanese University and participated in various cultural events and exhibitions. He died in Beirut in 2010 at the age of 81, leaving behind an artistic heritage ranging between various painting schools from Classical to Modern to Abstract. He also left behind many sculptures of varying topics and techniques.

Farid Mansour appears in the Benezit Dictionary of Artists - Oxford Art Online, and in October 2018 a documentary about Mansour was broadcast in the series             5 De Pic - Farid Mansour on Tele Liban, the Lebanese Official TV Station

In addition to being an artist, Farid Mansour was also a caricaturist, a poet, a critic and a writer publishing in several Lebanese and Arab journals such as Alsafir, Alanwar, Alnidaa’, Alanbaa’, Alshiraa’, Alarabi, Alazmina Alarabiya, Alkhalijiya.

On June 14, 2019, a Tribute to Farid Mansour was organized in his town of Choueifat under the patronage of the Lebanese Ministry of Culture and was honored by Montada Insan, Lebanese Artists Association, Syndicate of the Lebanese Artists.

Artistic Work Stages 
Mansour mastered various painting and sculpting techniques. 
His artworks could be divided into four phases:

- 1950s to mid 1960s: Experimenting with various painting techniques influenced by the tutoring of Manetti himself. Nature, Still Life paintings, and portraits were the dominant subjects of his artworks during this period. It is clear from his paintings that he was experimenting with various techniques mainly oil.

- Mid 1960s to mid 1970s: During his stay in Europe, mainly in the UK, Mansour mastered oil painting. Most of his works influenced by 19th and 20th century British artists, focusing mainly on Genre-Painting, Portrait and Still life. During this period he also mastered various sculpting techniques, and worked many sculptures for the Madame Tussaud museum.

- 1977 - 1990s: During this period, the Lebanese war erupted. Mansour was greatly influenced and touched by the atrocities of the war. His works during this period mirrored violent events and its influence on people. This is clearly showing in his paintings where the intense emotions were reflected on the faces of his subjects as well as the overall scenery of war and destruction. During this phase there was a tendency to shift from oil to pastel and charcoal as well as water colors in his paintings. This was mainly due to the fact that oil paintings would take a substantially longer time to finish during a period of instability and continuous move to shelters avoiding heavy shelling. In addition to that he was forced to use whatever material and painting utensils available for him at that time. His sculptures also reflected dramatic events. It also embodied his longing towards an equal, free and prosperous society.

- Late 1990s - 2010: Following the end of the Lebanese war, Mansour was morally and psychologically devastated by the long years of the civil war and the various foreign occupations of his country. He was in a state of despair and depression as his utopian vision of a just and equal society after a fierce civil war was shattered into pieces. At this stage and as if trying to erase the war's impact on him, he worked solely with Pastel, crayons and water colors. Famous for his pastel techniques, more towards Fauvism using ultra bright colors in his paintings in a very homogeneous non repulsive manner seamlessly blending them together, focusing mainly on nature and people working their land.

Art Works 
"Moments before the hanging": One of his most striking sculptures, is an apt description for the aura of terror emanating from the man's face as feelings of dread and fear are combined with the realization of his fate as the noose tightens around his neck . It is believed that the piece has been lost/stolen during one of the various episodes of the Lebanese war.

Samira, Oil on Canvas 50x40 - 1983: An 8-year-old child, forced by her parents to work as a housekeeper in one of the artist's neighbors' house to serve as an additional source of income.
Farid, a highly humanitarian person who is very sympathetic to the issues of the oppressed and vulnerable victims was touched by this incident and decided to pay tribute to Samira (the child's name) with a stunning portrait.
As with most of his works Farid would reflect the deep emotional state of the person being painted.
In this painting you find a powerful, defiant and piercing look in Samira's eyes reflecting a feeling of revolution and unbridled dignity.

Adib - Water Color 15x20cm -1979: Adib a university Student in Beirut, the moment a bomb hit campus, and injured some of his classmates. Mansour reflected the intense shocking emotions on the student's face.

Exhibitions 
Farid Mansour participated in many solo exhibitions:

 1962 – West Hall, American University of Beirut
 1967 – Soviet Cultural Center – Beirut
 1980 – Choueifat Municipality Hall – Choueifat, Lebanon
 1980 – Ras El Matn – Ras El Matn, Lebanon
 1980 – Soviet Union Graduates Alumni - Ministry of Tourism, the Glass Hall
 1988 – Soviet Cultural Center – Beirut  
 2006 – Lebanese Artists Association with artists Adnan Al Masri and Moufid Zeitouni

He also participated in many national exhibitions since the year 1959:
 Sursok Museum - Beirut
 UNESCO Hall - Beirut  
 Ministry of Tourism - Beirut 
 Beit El Din Castle - Beit El Din
 Lebanese university - Beirut 
 Soviet Cultural Center - Beirut

On the international level, he continuously participated in exhibitions such as :
 1971 - 1976 Mall Galleries in London 
 1983 – Al Turath Gallery, New York
 1987 - Institut du Monde Arabe, Paris
 1988 – National Museum, Damascus
 1989 – Barbican Center, London

References 

 "Mansour, Farid", Benezit Dictionary of Artists, Oxford Art Online.
 Heathcote, Graham (April 20, 1989). "Art Survives Shot And Shell To Reach London". AP News Archive.
 Dr. Ziad Abu-Faraj private Photos and Biography of Farid Mansour.
 Michel Fani – Dictionnaire de la Peinture au Liban – Edition de l’escalier 1998
 Oussama Mansour Abou Faraj, Private Photos and Biography of Farid Mansour
 Lebanon - The Artist's View   1989 by British Lebanese Association and Sir Hugh Casson

20th-century Lebanese sculptors
Artists from Beirut
Lebanese sculptors
Lebanese painters
Lebanese contemporary artists
Impressionist painters
1929 births
2010 deaths
20th-century Lebanese painters
Lebanese Impressionist painters